Kunishige (written: 邦茂 or 邦成) is a masculine Japanese given name. Notable people with the name include:

, Japanese samurai
, Japanese footballer, manager and politician

Kunishige (written: 國重) is also a Japanese surname. Notable people with the surname include:

Frank Kunishige (1878–1960), Japanese-American Pictorialist photographer
, Japanese scholar and translator

Japanese-language surnames
Japanese masculine given names